Opsiclines leucomorpha is a moth of the  family Yponomeutidae. It is found in southern Australia.

External links
Australian Faunal Directory

Yponomeutidae
Moths described in 1900